Search for Majora is a 1949 West German crime film directed by Hermann Pfeiffer and starring Lotte Koch, Hermann Speelmans and Camilla Horn.

The film's sets were designed by the art director Alfred Bütow.

Cast
 Lotte Koch as Frau Dr. Otto
 Hermann Speelmans as Will Blom
 Camilla Horn as Gritt Faller
 Harald Paulsen as Der eitle Harry
 Rudolf Therkatz as Dr. Neuhoff
 Paul Henckels as Portier Wilkens
 Hans Zesch-Ballot as Prof. Mengler
 Werner Hessenland as Manzeiras
 Willy Millowitsch as Prack
 Tim Nolte as Klaus Otto
 Heinz Erhardt as singender Pianist
 Hans Fitz
 Marja Tamara
 Max Eckard
 Hans Müller-Westernhagen  H

References

Bibliography
 Davidson, John & Hake, Sabine. Framing the Fifties: Cinema in a Divided Germany. Berghahn Books, 2007.

External links 
 

1949 films
1949 crime films
German crime films
West German films
1940s German-language films
Films directed by Hermann Pfeiffer
German black-and-white films
1940s German films